Orthogonius stygius is a species of ground beetle in the subfamily Orthogoniinae. It was described by Andrewes in 1930.

References

stygius
Beetles described in 1930